Brzeziny (Brezin) is a town in Poland, in Łódź Voivodeship, about 20 km east of Łódź.  It is the capital of Brzeziny County and has a population of 12,326 as of December 2021.  It once was a thriving Jewish shtetl noted for its tailors.

History 

The first settlement on the site of the present town of Brzeziny was during the 13th Century. The first documentary evidence of the town charter dates from 1332. The town played an important role in the development of trade between Russia and the Polish town of Toruń from the 15th to 17th centuries. Of particular economic importance was craft and tailoring.

Brzeziny was one of the oldest Jewish settlements in Poland, and was known as Krakówek ("Little Krakow"). Polish noblewoman Anna Łasocka brought the first Jewish weavers to Brzeziny, and in 1547 was the first reference to a Jewish population.

In 1793, following the Second Partition of Poland, the town and region was annexed into the Kingdom of Prussia as South Prussia. In July 1807, following the Treaty of Tilsit, the town was transferred to the Duchy of Warsaw and after June 1815, became part of the Russian Congress Poland to 1916.
During World War I Austrian and German armies were very active in the region. The Prussian General Karl Litzmann won an important battle here against the Russian army and earned the nickname "the lion of Brzeziny". From November 1916, with Poland mostly occupied by Austrian and German armies, the autonomous Regency Kingdom of Poland (Królestwo Regencyjne) governed the area until the declaration of the Second Polish Republic in 1918.

Beginning in 1939 and the German occupation  of Poland in World War II the entire region was part of the notorious Reichsgau Wartheland governed by SS Obergruppenfuhrer Arthur Greiser. The town was renamed Löwenstadt to honour Karl Litzmann.  A ghetto was established in early 1940 and about 6000 Brzeziny Jews were imprisoned there. Many died there of starvation, disease, and murder by the Germans.  Some Poles tried to help by smuggling food into the ghetto. In 1942, hundreds of elderly, sick, and mothers with children were sent to Chelmno and were immediately gassed.  Others were deported to the Lodz ghetto where most died or were sent to Auschwitz later.  About 200 to 300 of the 6850 Jews living in Brzeziny at the beginning of the war survived.

On 18 January 1945 the Red Army reached Brzeziny.

Twin towns
Brzeziny is twinned with:

  Saint-Alban, Haute-Garonne, France, since 2010
  Salgareda, Italy, since 2010

Notable residents 
 Andrzej Frycz Modrzewski  (1503-1572),  Polish Renaissance scholar, humanist and theologian, called "the father of Polish democracy." 
 Grzegorz Paweł z Brzezin (ca. 1525-1591),  Socinian writer and theologian
 Adam Burski or Bursius (ca. 1560–1611), Polish philosopher 
 Abraham Icek Tuschinski (1886-1942), businessman
 Georg Wannagat (1916-2006), jurist
 Zbigniew Zamachowski (1961-), Polish actor

References

External links
Official town webpage
Brzeziny Memorial Book

Cities and towns in Łódź Voivodeship
Brzeziny County
Piotrków Governorate
Łódź Voivodeship (1919–1939)
Populated places established in the 13th century
Shtetls